John Bray may refer to:

John Bray (physician) ( 1377), English botanist and physician
John Bray (composer) (1782–1822), composer of music for ''The Indian Princess
John Bray (cricketer) (born 1938), New Zealand cricketer
John Cox Bray (1842–1894), Premier of South Australia
John Jefferson Bray (1912–1995), Chief Justice of South Australia, poet
John Randolph Bray (1879–1978), American producer, inventor, animator, director
John Bray (athlete) (1875–1945), American athlete and Olympic bronze medallist in 1900
John Bray (communications engineer) (1911–2004), British communications engineer
John Francis Bray (1809–1897), American social activist and political economist
John Bray (boxer) (born 1970), American amateur boxer-turned boxing trainer
John Bray (footballer) (1937–1992), English footballer who played in the 1960 FA Cup Final
John Bray (rugby league), New Zealand rugby league player
Jackie Bray (1909–1982), English footballer and manager